Carl Torsten Leopold Sylvan (28 January 1895 – 26 April 1970) was a Swedish Army officer and horse rider who competed in the 1924 Summer Olympics. He and his horse Anita finished ninth in the individual eventing and won a silver medal with the Swedish eventing team.

Sylvan became major in the reserve in 1940.

Awards and decorations
Knight of the Order of the Sword
Knight of the Order of the White Rose of Finland

References

1895 births
1970 deaths
Swedish Army officers
Swedish event riders
Olympic equestrians of Sweden
Swedish male equestrians
Equestrians at the 1924 Summer Olympics
Olympic silver medalists for Sweden
Olympic medalists in equestrian
People from Gotland
Medalists at the 1924 Summer Olympics
Sportspeople from Gotland County